Frederick Blake may refer to:

 Frederick Blake Jr. (born 1977), Canadian politician
 Frederick Donald Blake (1908–1997), Scottish artist